D102 is a state road connecting the mainland to island of Krk and terminating at the southern tip of the island in Baška. The road is 48.3 km long.

D102 is the main road route on the island of Krk. The northern terminus of the road is located near Kraljevica, at an intersection with D8 state route - the Adriatic Highway. The road includes Krk bridge.

In the northern part of the island, between Omišalj and Malinska it runs parallel to the shore at a distance of approximately 2 km. In that section, short D103 state road connects D102 to Rijeka Airport. Further to the south, D102 extends through the centre of the island to the city of Krk. In that section, another state road, D104 branches off to the southwest towards Valbiska ferry port. D102 bypasses the city of Krk, and proceeds southeast to Baška.

The road, as well as all other state roads in Croatia, is managed and maintained by Hrvatske ceste, a state-owned company. However, Krk Bridge is managed by Autocesta Rijeka - Zagreb company.

Traffic volume 

Traffic is regularly counted and reported by Hrvatske ceste, operator of the road. Substantial variations between annual (AADT) and summer (ASDT) traffic volumes are attributed to the fact that the road serves as a connection to A6 motorway and D8 state road carrying substantial tourist traffic.

Road junctions and populated areas

Sources

See also

 Hrvatske ceste
 Autocesta Rijeka - Zagreb
 Krk Bridge

State roads in Croatia
Transport in Primorje-Gorski Kotar County
Roads with a reversible lane